Eogyrinidae is an extinct family of large, long-bodied tetrapods that lived in the rivers of the Late Carboniferous period.

Gallery

Embolomeres
Carboniferous vertebrates
Pennsylvanian first appearances
Pennsylvanian extinctions
Prehistoric tetrapod families